The Basilica of the Visitation is a baroque, collegiate parish church located in the western part of the island of Gozo in the village of Għarb.

History
Għarb became an independent parish on 29 August 1679 by Bishop Michael Molina. It was the second parish to be established outside Victoria. The first parish church was that of the Visitation located downhill to the present church. The original parish church, also known as Taż-Żejt is located beside the village cemetery. Since the population of the village grew it was decided to build a bigger church in a more central part of the village. The present church was built between 1699 and 1729. It has an elegant façade which has been compared with Francesco Borromini's Church of Saint Agnes in Piazza Navona, Rome. The church was consecrated on 28 September 1755. The church became the second Collegiate of Gozo on 19 May 1774 and was elevated to the status of a minor Basilica on 28 November 1967. Once the church became a minor basilica in 1967 by Pope Paul VI, it acquired the Umbraculum and the Tintinnabulum. These two items, as can be seen in the photo, are carried in the procession in which the collegiate chapter of the church participates in. Also the same image on the left shows the coat of arms of both the Diocese and the incumbent Pope. A Minor Basilica has the privilege of including the Pope's coat of arms over the church's main door.

The church building is listed on the National Inventory of the Cultural Property of the Maltese Islands.

See also

Culture of Malta
History of Malta
List of Churches in Malta
Religion in Malta

References

Collegiate churches in Malta
1699 establishments in Malta
17th-century Roman Catholic church buildings in Malta
Roman Catholic churches completed in 1729
Għarb
Baroque church buildings in Malta
Basilica churches in Malta
National Inventory of the Cultural Property of the Maltese Islands
Limestone churches in Malta